Tamil New Zealanders are New Zealand citizens and residents of Tamil ethnicity or ancestry. An estimated number of 3000 Tamils currently reside in the country. In the 2013 New Zealand census, there were 303 Indian Tamils and 732 Sri Lankan Tamils who were usually residents.

Notable Tamil New Zealanders

 Brannavan Gnanalingam - Novelist and film critic
 Sabby Jey- Model and Actress
 Ahi Karunaharan - Actor, Writer, Director, Musician and Producer
 Mayu Pasupati, Jaffna-born New Zealand cricketer
 Kumar Velambalam - President of the New Zealand Sri Lanka Foundation
 Vanushi Walters - Human rights activist, lawyer, and politician

Tamil Societies 

 Canterbury TAMIL Society
 Wellington Tamil Society Inc
 New Zealand Tamil Society
 Auckland Tamil Association Inc
 Dunedin Tamil Society
 Muth Tamil Sangam Inc.
 Tamil Society Waikato Incorporated

References

Asian New Zealander
 
New Zealand